Simone Renant (19 March 1911 – 29 March 2004) was a French film actress. She appeared in more than 40 films between 1934 and 1983. She was born in Amiens, France and died in Garches, France.

Partial filmography

 La folle nuit (1932)
 Escale (1935)
 You Can't Fool Antoinette (1936) - Antoinette
 L'école des journalistes (1936) - Simone Dubreuil
 The Mysterious Lady (1936) - La secrétaire
 L'ange du foyer (1937)
 The Pearls of the Crown (1937) - Madame Du Barry
 Rail Pirates (1938) - Marie Pierson
 They Were Twelve Women (1940) - Gaby
 Miss Bonaparte (1942) - Adèle Rémy
 The Duchess of Langeais (1942) - La vicomtesse Emilie de Fontaines
 Romance à trois (1942) - Huguette
 Lettres d'amour (1942) - La préfète Hortense de la Jacquerie
 Domino (1943) - Laurette
 Voyage Without Hope (1943) - Marie-Ange
 La tentation de Barbizon (1946) - L'ange et Eva Parker / Angel
 L'ange qu'on m'a donné (1946) - Claire Girard
 The Mysterious Monsieur Sylvain (1947) - Françoise Dastier
 Quai des Orfèvres (1947) - Dora Monier
 After Love (1947) - Nicole Mésaule
 The Cupid Club (1949) - Isabelle
 No Pity for Women (1950) - Marianne Séverin
 L'homme de joie (1950) - Madeleine Jolivet
 Tapage nocturne (1951) - Marie Varescot
 Son of the Hunchback (1952) - Mathilde Pérolle
 The Night Is Ours (1953) - Françoise Clozat
 Stopover in Orly (1955) - Gloria Morena
 Bedevilled (1955) - Francesca
 If Paris Were Told to Us (1956) - Marquise de V...
 The Ostrich Has Two Eggs (1957) - Thérèse Barjus
 Échec au porteur (1958) - Denise Giraucourt
 The Adventures of Remi (1958) - Lady Mary Milligan
 Women Are Weak (1959) - Marguerite Maroni, Helene's mother
 Les liaisons dangereuses (1959) - Mme Volanges
 Love and the Frenchwoman (1960) - Desire's advocate (segment "Femme seule, La")
 Vive Henri IV... vive l'amour! (1961) - Charlotte de Trémoille
 Cadavres en vacances (1963) - L'hôtelière
 That Man from Rio (1964) - Lola, Cabaret Singer
 Love Is a Funny Thing (1969) - Françoise's friend - cameo appearance
 Dear Inspector (1977) - Suzanne
 Three Men to Kill (1980) - Mme. Gerfaut

References

External links

French film actresses
1911 births
2004 deaths
People from Amiens
20th-century French actresses